Lowiena is a Dutchified form of Louise that has been used in the Netherlands since at least the 19th century. Although still rare, it is more common in the northern part of the country (Friesland, Groningen and Drenthe).

References 

Feminine given names
Dutch feminine given names